Saekano: How to Raise a Boring Girlfriend, known in Japan as  and the short form  is a Japanese romantic comedy light novel series written by Fumiaki Maruto, with illustrations by Kurehito Misaki. Fujimi Shobo published thirteen volumes between July 2012 and October 2017 under their Fujimi Fantasia Bunko imprint. The story follows high school student Tomoya Aki, who recruits a trio of beautiful girls to help him develop a visual novel to sell at the Comiket convention.

Saekano has received a manga adaptation in addition to three spin-off manga adaptations. An anime television series adaptation by A-1 Pictures aired between January 9 and March 27, 2015 on Fuji TV's noitamina block, which has been licensed by Aniplex of America. A second season aired from April 6, 2017 to June 23, 2017, and was streamed exclusively on Amazon Video. A visual novel based on the anime, titled Saenai Heroine no Sodatekata -Blessing Flowers-, was released on April 30, 2015. An animated film, titled Saekano the Movie: Finale, was produced by CloverWorks and premiered on October 26, 2019.

Premise 

Tomoya Aki, a male high school teenager who works part-time to fund his otaku lifestyle (light novels, manga, anime, video games like visual novels and dating sims, and related merchandise) encounters a beautiful girl one day during spring vacation. A month later, he finds out that the girl is his classmate, Megumi Kato, who is hardly noticeable to her classmates. Hoping to create a visual novel computer game, he turns to school beauties Eriri Spencer Sawamura for designing the art, and Utaha Kasumigaoka for writing the game scenario. Tomoya then recruits Megumi to star as the "heroine" (the main character's love interest) of his game, thus forming the development team "Blessing Software", in which the three most renowned students in the school (Tomoya, Eriri, and Utaha) work on one of the least noticeable (Megumi). The series follows their adventures in developing the game and their plans to sell it at the Comiket convention, as well as the emotional entanglements among the team.

Publication 

Saekano: How to Raise a Boring Girlfriend began as a light novel series written by Fumiaki Maruto, with illustrations provided by Kurehito Misaki. The first light novel volume was published by Fujimi Shobo under their Fujimi Fantasia Bunko imprint on July 20, 2012. In the twelfth volume, Maruto announced that the series would end in the thirteenth volume, which was released on October 20, 2017. As of November 2018, thirteen volumes and two short story collections have been published.

Media

Manga 
 
A manga adaptation with art by Takeshi Moriki was serialized from January 9, 2013 to August 9, 2016 in Fujimi Shobo's shōnen manga magazine Monthly Dragon Age. It has been collected in eight tankōbon volumes between August 2013 and November 2016. It has also been published in English by Yen Press between January 2016 and December 2017.

A spin-off manga titled  with art by Niito was serialized from February 4, 2013 to May 2, 2014 in Kadokawa Shoten's seinen manga magazine Young Ace. It has been collected in three tankōbon volumes. Another spin-off manga titled  with art by Sabu Musha was serialized from August 24, 2013 to April 25, 2018 in Square Enix's seinen manga magazine Big Gangan. It has been collected in ten tankōbon volumes. A manga adaptation of Saenai Heroine no Sodatekata: Girls Side was serialized in Fujimi Shobo's Monthly Dragon Age magazine from September 9, 2016 to June 9, 2017. It has been collected in two tankōbon volumes.

Anime series 

An anime television series adaptation of the light novel series was announced in March 2014 to premiere on Fuji TV's Noitamina block in January 2015. The anime was produced by A-1 Pictures and directed by Kanta Kamei, with scripts written by series creator Fumiaki Maruto, character designs by Tomoaki Takase and music by Hajime Hyakkoku. The series began airing on January 9, 2015 and finished airing on March 27, 2015 with a total of 13 episodes. The first season has been licensed for North America by Aniplex of America.

A second season to the anime series, titled  was announced on May 3, 2015, with the main staff and cast returning from the previous season to reprise their roles. It aired on Fuji TV's Noitamina block from April 13, 2017 to June 23, 2017 running for 12 episodes, with the web-only episode 0 streamed on April 5, 2017. The second season streamed exclusively on Amazon Video.

Theatrical film 

An anime film was announced at the "Saekano: How to Raise a Boring Girlfriend Fes. flat -glistening moment-" event on December 3, 2017. The all-new film, titled  was produced by CloverWorks and directed by Akihisa Shibata, with Kanta Kamei serving as chief director. The rest of the main staff and cast from the anime series returned to reprise their roles. It premiered in Japan on October 26, 2019. The theme song "glory days", was sung by Luna Haruna, with Miku Sawai composing.

Video game 
A PlayStation Vita visual novel based on the anime, titled  was released on April 30, 2015. A limited edition with an original soundtrack CD and a B2-size cloth poster retailed for 8,800 yen (about US$74), a regular edition for 6,800 yen (US$57), and a download edition for 6,000 yen (US$51). The first copies of all editions included a download code for an original custom PS Vita theme. The game utilizes Live2D software, which moves the characters with CGI but retains their two-dimensional look.

Reception 
Saekano: How to Raise a Boring Girlfriend ranked 10th place on the "Top-Selling Light Novels in Japan by Series" with 227,314 copies sold in the period between November 2014 and May 2015, and later ranked 16th place with 313,744 copies sold between November 2014 and November 2015.

See also

Notes

References

External links 
 
 
 

2012 Japanese novels
2015 anime television series debuts
2015 Japanese novels
2017 anime television series debuts
A-1 Pictures
Anime and manga based on light novels
Anime Strike
Aniplex franchises
Book series introduced in 2012
Fujimi Fantasia Bunko
Fujimi Shobo manga
Gangan Comics manga
Kadokawa Dwango franchises
Kadokawa Shoten manga
Light novels
Noitamina
Seinen manga
Shōnen manga
Works about video games
Visual novels
Yen Press titles